|}

The Yorkshire Oaks is a Group 1 flat horse race in Great Britain open to fillies and mares aged three years or older. It is run at York over a distance of 1 mile 3 furlongs and 188 yards (2,385 metres), and it is scheduled to take place each year in August.

History
The event was established in 1849, and it was originally restricted to fillies aged three. The inaugural running was won by Ellen Middleton, owned by the 2nd Earl of Zetland.

The present system of race grading was introduced in 1971, and the Yorkshire Oaks was subsequently classed at Group 1 level. It was opened to older fillies and mares in 1991.

The race has been sponsored by Darley Stud since 2006, and it is currently held on the second day of York's four-day Ebor Festival meeting.

The Yorkshire Oaks often features horses which ran previously in The Oaks. The first to achieve victory in both races was Brown Duchess in 1861, and the most recent was Snowfall in 2021.

Records
Most successful horse (2 wins):
 Only Royale – 1993, 1994
 Islington – 2002, 2003
 Enable - 2017, 2019

Leading jockey (8 wins):
 Fred Archer – Spinaway (1875), Lady Golightly (1877), Jannette (1878), Wheel of Fortune (1879), Dutch Oven (1882), Britomartis (1883), Clochette (1884), Philosophy (1886)

Leading trainer (9 wins):
 Mathew Dawson – Leonie (1868), Gertrude (1870), Spinaway (1875), Lady Golightly (1877), Jannette (1878), Wheel of Fortune (1879), Dutch Oven (1882), Britomartis (1883), Clochette (1884)
 Sir Michael Stoute – Fair Salinia (1978), Sally Brown (1985), Untold (1986), Hellenic (1990), Pure Grain (1995), Petrushka (2000), Islington (2002, 2003), Quiff (2004)

Leading owner (7 wins):
 6th Viscount Falmouth – Gertrude (1870), Spinaway (1875), Lady Golightly (1877), Jannette (1878), Wheel of Fortune (1879), Dutch Oven (1882), Britomartis (1883)

Winners since 1946

Earlier winners

 1849: Ellen Middleton
 1850: Brightonia
 1851: Vivandiere
 1852: Adine
 1853: Mayfair
 1854: Virago
 1855: Capucine
 1856: Victoria
 1857: Tasmania
 1858: The Argosy
 1859: Bilberry
 1860: Stockade
 1861: Brown Duchess
 1862: Feu de Joie
 1863: Miss Armstrong
 1864: Gondola
 1865: Klarinska
 1866: Lady Vane
 1867: Ines
 1868: Leonie
 1869: Toison d'Or
 1870: Gertrude
 1871: Rebecca
 1872: Maid of Perth
 1873: Marie Stuart
 1874: The Pique
 1875: Spinaway
 1876: Zee
 1877: Lady Golightly
 1878: Jannette
 1879: Wheel of Fortune
 1880: Belfry
 1881: Thebais
 1882: Dutch Oven
 1883: Britomartis
 1884: Clochette
 1885: St Helena
 1886: Philosophy
 1887: Reve d'Or
 1888: Briar-root
 1889: Antibes
 1890: Ponza
 1891: Charm
 1892: Gantlet
 1893: Siffleuse
 1894: Spring Ray
 1895: Nighean
 1896: Helm
 1897: Fortalice
 1898: Fairmile
 1899: Victoria May
 1900: La Roche
 1901: Santa Brigida
 1902: Ice-maiden
 1903: Hammerkop
 1904: Bitters
 1905: Costly Lady
 1906: Catnap
 1907: Order of Merit
 1908: Siberia
 1909: Collet Monte
 1910: Winkipop
 1911: Alice
 1912–18: no race
 1919: Mademoiselle Foch
 1920: Inflorescence
 1921: Love in Idleness
 1922: Sister-in-Law
 1923: Splendid Jay
 1924: Blue Ice
 1925: Brodick Bay
 1926: Doushka
 1927: Gioconda
 1928: Rye Water
 1929: Flittemere
 1930: Glorious Devon
 1931: Rackety Lassie
 1932: Nash Light / Will o' the Wisp *
 1933: Star of England
 1934: Dalmary
 1935: Trigo Verde
 1936: Silversol
 1937: Sculpture
 1938: Joyce W
 1939: Night Shift
 1940–45: no race

* The 1932 race was a dead-heat and has joint winners.

See also
 Horse racing in Great Britain
 List of British flat horse races

References
 Paris-Turf: 
 Racing Post:

 galopp-sieger.de – Yorkshire Oaks.
 ifhaonline.org – International Federation of Horseracing Authorities – Yorkshire Oaks (2019).
 pedigreequery.com – Yorkshire Oaks – York.
 

Flat races in Great Britain
York Racecourse
Long-distance horse races for fillies and mares
Recurring sporting events established in 1849
Breeders' Cup Challenge series
British Champions Series
1849 establishments in England